The list of mammals of Kansas comprises 100 mammals recorded in the U.S. state of Kansas. It includes both native and introduced species which can have a negative impact on the ecosystem but does not include domesticated animals. Four of these species that have been extirpated from the state are the  gray wolf, grizzly bear, cougar, and the black-footed ferret.

Didelphimorphia (opossums)

Opossums
Family: Didelphidae
 Virginia opossum, Didelphis virginiana

Cingulata (armadillos)

Armadillos
Family: Dasypodidae
Nine-banded armadillo, Dasypus novemcinctus

Eulipotyphla (shrews and moles)

Shrews
Family: Soricidae
Southern short-tailed shrew, Blarina carolinensis
Elliot's short-tailed shrew, Blarina hylophaga
Least shrew, Cryptotis parva
Prairie shrew, Sorex haydeni

Moles
Family: Talpidae
Eastern mole, Scalopus aquaticus

Rodentia (rodents)

Beavers
Family: Castoridae
North American beaver, Castor canadensis

Pocket gophers
Family: Geomyidae
Yellow-faced pocket gopher, Cratogeomys castanops
Plains pocket gopher, Geomys bursarius

Kangaroo rats and pocket mice
Family: Heteromyidae
Ord's kangaroo rat, Dipodomys ordii
Hispid pocket mouse, Perognathus fasciatus
Plains pocket mouse, Perognathus flavescens
Silky pocket mouse, Perognathus flavus

Porcupines
Family: Erethizontidae
North American porcupine, Erethizon dorsatum

Jumping mice
Family: Dipodidae
Meadow jumping mouse, Zapus hudsonius

New World rats, mice, and voles
Family: Cricetidae
Long-tailed vole, Microtus longicaudus
Prairie vole, Microtus ochrogaster
Meadow vole, Microtus pennsylvanicus
Woodland vole, Microtus pinetorum
White-throated woodrat, Neotoma albigula
Eastern woodrat, Neotoma floridana
Southern plains woodrat, Neotoma micropus
Muskrat, Ondatra zibethicus
Northern grasshopper mouse, Onychomys leucogaster
Marsh rice rat, Oryzomys palustris
Texas mouse, Peromyscus attwateri
White-footed mouse, Peromyscus leucopus
Western deer mouse, Peromyscus sonoriensis
Fulvous harvest mouse, Reithrodontomys fulvescens
Eastern harvest mouse, Reithrodontomys humulis
Western harvest mouse, Reithrodontomys megalotis
Plains harvest mouse, Reithrodontomys montanus
Hispid cotton rat, Sigmodon hispidus

Old World rats and mice
Family: Muridae
House mouse, Mus musculus introduced
Brown rat, Rattus norvegicus introduced
Black rat, Rattus rattus introduced

Chipmunks, marmots, and squirrels
Family: Sciuridae
Black-tailed prairie dog, Cynomys ludovicianus
Southern flying squirrel, Glaucomys volans
Thirteen-lined ground squirrel, Ictodomys tridecemlineatus
Groundhog, Marmota monax
Colorado chipmunk, Neotamias quadrivittatus
Rock squirrel, Otospermophilus variegatus
Eastern gray squirrel, Sciurus carolinensis
Fox squirrel, Sciurus niger
Eastern chipmunk, Tamias striatus
Spotted ground squirrel, Xerospermophilus spilosoma

Nutria
Family: Myocastoridae
Nutria, Myocastor coypus introduced

Lagomorpha (lagomorphs)

Rabbits and hares
Family: Leporidae
Black-tailed jackrabbit, Lepus californicus
White-tailed jackrabbit, Lepus townsendii
Swamp rabbit, Sylvilagus aquaticus
Desert cottontail, Sylvilagus audubonii
Eastern cottontail, Sylvilagus floridanus

Chiroptera (bats)

Vesper bats
Family: Vespertilionidae
Pallid bat, Antrozous pallidus
Townsend's big-eared bat, Corynorhinus townsendii
Big brown bat, Eptesicus fuscus
Silver-haired bat, Lasionycteris noctivagans
Eastern red bat, Lasiurus borealis
Hoary bat, Lasiurus cinereus
Western small-footed myotis, Myotis ciliolabrum
Gray bat, Myotis grisescens
Small-footed myotis, Myotis leibii
Little brown bat, Myotis lucifugus
Indiana myotis, Myotis sodalis
Cave myotis, Myotis velifer
Yuma myotis, Myotis yumanensis
Evening bat, Nycticeius humeralis
Western pipistrelle, Parastrellus hesperus
Eastern pipistrelle, Pipistrellus subflavus
Rafinesque's big-eared bat, Plecotus rafinesquii
Townsend's big-eared bat, Plecotus townsendii

Free-tailed bats
Family: Molossidae
Big free-tailed bat, Nyctinomops macrotis
Mexican free-tailed bat, Tadarida brasiliensis

Carnivora (carnivorans)

Felines
Family: Felidae
Bobcat, Lynx rufus
Cougar, Puma concolor extirpated
Eastern cougar, P. c. couguar extinct

Canids
Family: Canidae
Coyote, Canis latrans
Gray wolf, Canis lupus extirpated
Great Plains wolf, C. l. nubilus extinct
Gray fox, Urocyon cinereoargenteus
Swift fox, Vulpes velox
Red fox, Vulpes vulpes

Bears
Family: Ursidae
American black bear, Ursus americanus extirpated, vagrant
Brown bear, Ursus arctos extirpated
Grizzly bear, U. a. horribilis extirpated

Skunks
Family: Mephitidae
Striped skunk, Mephitis mephitis
Western spotted skunk, Spilogale gracilis
Eastern spotted skunk, Spilogale putorius

Mustelids
Family: Mustelidae
North American river otter, Lontra canadensis
Black-footed ferret, Mustela nigripes reintroduced
Least weasel, Mustela nivalis
Long-tailed weasel, Neogale frenata
American mink, Neogale vison
American badger, Taxidea taxus

Procyonids
Family: Procyonidae
Ringtail, Bassariscus astutus
Raccoon, Procyon lotor

Artiodactyla (even-toed ungulates)

Pronghorns
Family: Antilocapridae
Pronghorn, Antilocapra americana

Bovids
Family: Bovidae
American bison, Bison bison reintroduced
Plains bison, B. b. bison reintroduced

Deer
Family: Cervidae
Moose, Alces alces vagrant
Elk, Cervus canadensis 
Mule deer, Odocoileus hemionus
White-tailed deer, Odocoileus virginianus

See also
List of chordate orders
List of regional mammals lists

References

External links
Mammals in Kansas
Kansas Extension Wildlife Management

Kansas
Mammals